HMS Sampson was a 64-gun third rate ship of the line of the Royal Navy, launched on 8 May 1781 at Woolwich.

She was hulked in 1802 and broken up in 1832.

Notes

References

Lavery, Brian (2003) The Ship of the Line - Volume 1: The development of the battlefleet 1650-1850. Conway Maritime Press. .

Ships of the line of the Royal Navy
Intrepid-class ships of the line
1781 ships
Samson